Incheh-ye Sofla may refer to:
 Incheh-ye Sofla, North Khorasan
 Incheh-ye Sofla, West Azerbaijan
 Incheh-ye Sofla, Maku, West Azerbaijan Province
 Incheh-ye Sofla, Zanjan